The 1996 Australian Individual Speedway Championship was held at the Newcastle Showgrounds in Newcastle, New South Wales on 17 February 1996. The Newcastle Showgrounds had last hosted an Australian Solo Championship in 1927 when it was a ½ mile track and not the modern,  version.

Sydney's Craig Boyce won his second national championship and his second with a 15-point maximum. Defending champion Jason Crump finished second after defeating Queensland's Tony Langdon in a runoff. Triple Australian Champion Leigh Adams and fellow Mildura rider Jason Lyons claimed the final two Overseas Final qualifying positions.

1996 Australian Solo Championship
 Australian Championship
 17 February 1996
  Newcastle, New South Wales - Newcastle Showgrounds
 Referee: 
 Qualification: The top five riders go through to the Overseas Final in Coventry, England.

References

See also
 Australia national speedway team
 Sport in Australia

Speedway in Australia
Australia
Individual Speedway Championship